National System of Protected Areas (SINAP or SNAP) may refer to:

 National System of Protected Areas (Colombia), the Colombian national parks administrator
 National System of Protected Areas (Nicaragua), the Nicaraguan national parks administrator
 National System of Protected Areas in Uruguay, the Uruguayan national parks administrator